De forældreløse was a 1917 Norwegian drama film written and directed by Peter Lykke-Seest, starring Esben Lykke-Seest and Lullu Hansteen. The siblings Beate and Jens Coldevin are heirs to a great fortune, and their warden Robertson is trying to get his hands on the money. The film is today considered lost.

References

External links
 
 

1917 films
1917 drama films
Norwegian silent films
Lost Norwegian films
Norwegian black-and-white films
Norwegian drama films
1917 lost films
Lost drama films
Silent drama films